is a Japanese FM station based in Yuzawa, Akita, Japan.

References

Radio stations in Japan
Radio stations established in 1999
Mass media in Akita Prefecture
1999 establishments in Japan